Howard Palmer (born 23 September 1946) is a Barbadian sailor. He competed at the 1984 Summer Olympics and the 1988 Summer Olympics.

References

External links
 

1946 births
Living people
Barbadian male sailors (sport)
Olympic sailors of Barbados
Sailors at the 1984 Summer Olympics – Star
Sailors at the 1988 Summer Olympics – Star
Place of birth missing (living people)